Atkins v. Virginia, 536 U.S. 304 (2002), is a case in which the Supreme Court of the United States ruled 6-3 that executing people with intellectual disabilities violates the Eighth Amendment's ban on cruel and unusual punishments, but states can define who has an intellectual disability. At the time Atkins was decided, just 18 of the 38 death penalty states exempted intellectually disabled offenders from the death penalty.

Twelve years later in Hall v. Florida the U.S. Supreme Court narrowed the discretion under which U.S. states can designate an individual convicted of murder as too intellectually incapacitated to be executed.

The case

Around midnight on August 16, 1996, following a day spent together drinking alcohol and smoking marijuana, 18-year-old Daryl Renard Atkins (born November 6, 1977) and his accomplice, William Jones, walked to a nearby convenience store where they abducted Eric Nesbitt, an airman from nearby Langley Air Force Base. Unsatisfied with the $60 they found in his wallet, Atkins drove Nesbitt in his own vehicle to a nearby ATM and forced him to withdraw a further $200. In spite of Nesbitt's pleas, the two abductors then drove him to an isolated location, where he was shot eight times, killing him. 

Footage of Atkins and Jones in the vehicle with Nesbitt was captured on the ATM's CCTV camera, which showed Nesbitt in the middle between the two men and leaning across Jones to withdraw money. Further forensic evidence implicating the two men were found in Nesbitt's abandoned vehicle. The two suspects were quickly tracked down and arrested. In custody, each man claimed that the other had pulled the trigger. Atkins's version of the events, however, was found to contain a number of inconsistencies. Doubts concerning Atkins's testimony were strengthened when a cell-mate claimed that Atkins had confessed to him that he had shot Nesbitt. A deal of life imprisonment was negotiated with Jones in return for his full testimony against Atkins. The jury decided that Jones's version of events was the more coherent and credible, and convicted Atkins of capital murder.

During the penalty phase of the trial, the defense presented Atkins's school records and the results of an IQ test carried out by clinical psychologist Dr. Evan Nelson confirmed that he had an IQ of 59. On this basis they proposed that he was "mildly mentally retarded". Atkins was nevertheless sentenced to death.

On appeal, the Supreme Court of Virginia affirmed the conviction but reversed the sentence after finding that an improper sentencing verdict form had been used. At retrial, the prosecution proved two aggravating factors under Virginia law—that Atkins posed a risk of "future dangerousness" based on a string of previous violent convictions, and that the offense was committed in a vile manner. The state's witness, Dr. Stanton Samenow, countered the defense's arguments that Atkins was intellectually disabled, by stating that Atkins's vocabulary, general knowledge and behavior suggested that he possessed at most average intelligence. As a result, Atkins's death sentence was upheld. The Virginia Supreme Court subsequently affirmed the sentence based on a prior Supreme Court decision, Penry v. Lynaugh, 492 U.S. 302 (1989). Justice Cynthia D. Kinser authored the five-member majority. Justices Leroy Rountree Hassell Sr. and Lawrence L. Koontz Jr. each authored dissenting opinions and joined in each other's dissent.

Due to what it perceived to be a shift in the judgments of state legislatures as to whether intellectually disabled people are appropriate candidates for execution in the thirteen years since Penry was decided, the Supreme Court agreed to review Atkins's death sentence. The Court heard oral arguments in the case on February 20, 2002.

The ruling
The Eighth Amendment to the United States Constitution forbids cruel and unusual punishments. In the ruling, it was stated that, unlike other provisions of the Constitution, the Eighth Amendment should be interpreted in light of the "evolving standards of decency that mark the progress of a maturing society."  The best evidence on this score was determined to be the judgment of state legislatures. Accordingly, the Court had previously found that the death penalty was inappropriate for the crime of rape in Coker v. Georgia, 433 U.S. 584 (1977), or for those convicted of felony murder who neither themselves killed, attempted to kill, or intended to kill in Enmund v. Florida, 458 U.S. 782 (1982). The Court found that the Eighth Amendment forbids the imposition of the death penalty in these cases because "most of the legislatures that have recently addressed the matter" have rejected the death penalty for these offenders, and the Court will generally defer to the judgments of those bodies.

The Court then described how a national consensus that intellectually disabled people should not be executed had emerged. In 1986, Georgia was the first state to outlaw the execution of intellectually disabled people. Congress followed two years later, and the next year Maryland joined these two jurisdictions. Thus, when the Court confronted the issue in Penry in 1989, the Court could not say that a national consensus against executing intellectually disabled people had emerged. Over the next twelve years, nineteen more states exempted intellectually disabled people from capital punishment under their laws, bringing the total number of states to twenty-one, plus the federal government. While there are 50 states, 19 don't allow the death penalty under any circumstance, making 21 out of 31 a clear majority of the death penalty states. In light of the "consistency of direction of change" toward a prohibition on the execution of intellectually disabled people, and the relative rarity of such executions in states that still allow it, the Court proclaimed that a "national consensus has developed against it."  The Court, however, left it to individual states to make the difficult decision regarding what determines intellectual disability.

Also, the "relationship between mental retardation and the penological purposes served by the death penalty" justifies a conclusion that executing intellectually disabled people is cruel and unusual punishment that the Eighth Amendment should forbid. In other words, unless it can be shown that executing the intellectually disabled promotes the goals of retribution and deterrence, doing so is nothing more than "purposeless and needless imposition of pain and suffering", making the death penalty cruel and unusual in those cases. Being intellectually disabled means that a person not only has substandard intellectual functioning but also significant limitations in adaptive skills such as communication, self-care, and self-direction. These deficiencies typically manifest before the age of eighteen. Although they can know the difference between right and wrong, these deficiencies mean they have a lesser ability to learn from experience, engage in logical reasoning, and understand the reactions of others. This means that inflicting the death penalty on one intellectually disabled individual is less likely to deter other intellectually disabled individuals from committing crimes. As for retribution, society's interest in seeing that a criminal get his "just desserts" means that the death penalty must be confined to the "most serious" of murders, not simply the average murder. The goal of retribution is not served by imposing the death penalty on a group of people who have a significantly lesser capacity to understand why they are being executed.

Because intellectually disabled people are not able to communicate with the same sophistication as the average offender, there is a greater likelihood that their deficiency in communicative ability will be interpreted by juries as a lack of remorse for their crimes. They typically make poor witnesses, being more prone to suggestion and willing to "confess" in order to placate or please their questioner. Thus, there is a greater risk that the jury may impose the death penalty despite the existence of evidence that suggests that a lesser penalty should be imposed. In light of the "evolving standards of decency" that the Eighth Amendment demands, the fact that the goals of retribution and deterrence are not served as well in the execution of intellectually disabled people, and the heightened risk that the death penalty will be imposed erroneously, the Court concluded that the Eighth Amendment forbids the execution of intellectually disabled people.

In dissent, Justices Antonin Scalia, Clarence Thomas and Chief Justice William Rehnquist argued that in spite of the increased number of states that had outlawed the execution of intellectually disabled people, there was no clear national consensus, and even if one existed, the Eighth Amendment provided no basis for using such measures of opinion to determine what is "cruel and unusual". Justice Antonin Scalia commented in his dissent that "seldom has an opinion of this court rested so obviously upon nothing but the personal views of its members." The citing of an amicus brief from the European Union also drew criticism from Chief Justice Rehnquist, who denounced the "Court's decision to place weight on foreign laws".

Subsequent Supreme Court decisions
Twelve years after its Atkins decision the U.S. Supreme Court narrowed in Hall v. Florida (2014) the discretion under which U.S. states can designate an individual convicted of murder as too intellectually incapacitated to be executed. The Court laid down as a legal rule that "if the individual claiming intellectual incapacity has an IQ score that falls somewhere between 70 and 75, then that individual's lawyers must be allowed to offer additional clinical evidence of intellectual deficit, including, most importantly, the inability to learn basic skills and adapt, how to react to changing circumstances."

In Moore v. Texas (2017) the Supreme Court stated although the states have the primary responsibility for "the task of developing appropriate ways to enforce" the Eighth Amendment's prohibition of executing intellectually disabled persons, they can't do this in the way they want. States must closely take into account the most recent medical guide on intellectual disabilities. "A diagnosis of intellectual disability requires three things: 1) significantly subaverarge intellectual functioning (typically measured by an IQ score roughly two standard deviations below the mean); 2) adaptive-functioning deficits; and 3) an onset during childhood, before reaching 18. As the court recognized in Hall v. Florida (2014), intellectual disability is a condition, not an IQ score, and proper diagnosis thus places great emphasis on the second requirement, related to adaptive functioning." The Court further decided that instead of stereotypes, science should govern death penalty cases involving intellectually-disabled prisoners and that courts should base their decisions on opinions of professional organizations like the American Psychological Association.

Subsequent developments for Daryl Atkins
A jury in Virginia decided in July 2005 that Atkins was intelligent enough to be executed on the basis that the constant contact he had with his lawyers provided intellectual stimulation and raised his IQ above 70, making him competent to be put to death under Virginia law. The prosecution had argued that his poor school performance was caused by his use of alcohol and drugs, and that his lower scores in earlier IQ tests were tainted. 

In January 2008, Circuit Court Judge Prentis Smiley, who was revisiting the matter of whether Atkins was mentally disabled, received allegations of prosecutorial misconduct.  These allegations, if true, would have authorized a new trial for Atkins. After two days of testimony on the matter, Smiley determined that prosecutorial misconduct had occurred. At this juncture, Smiley could have vacated Atkins's conviction and ordered a new trial. Instead, Smiley determined the evidence was overwhelming that Atkins had participated in a felony murder and commuted Atkins's sentence to life in prison.

Prosecutors sought writs of mandamus and prohibition in the Virginia Supreme Court on the matter, claiming Smiley had exceeded his judicial authority with his ruling. On June 4, 2009, the Virginia Supreme Court, in a 5-2 decision authored by Chief Justice Leroy R. Hassell Sr., ruled that neither mandamus nor prohibition was available to overturn the court's decision to commute the sentence. Justice Cynthia D. Kinser, joined by Justice Donald W. Lemons, considered the two most conservative justices of the Court, wrote a lengthy dissent that was highly critical of both the majority's reasoning and the action of the circuit court in commuting the sentence.

See also
 List of United States Supreme Court decisions on capital punishment
 List of United States Supreme Court cases, volume 536
 List of United States Supreme Court cases
 Bigby v. Dretke
 Hall v. Florida - A 2014 U.S. Supreme Court case limiting the death penalty in the wake of Atkins v. Virginia
 Monster (Walter Dean Myers novel)

Footnotes

External links
 
  Transcript of oral argument
  Information about Atkins from the Death Penalty Information Center, an anti-capital punishment clearinghouse
 "Killer's fate hanging on his IQ" at BBC News
  Information about applying Atkins from the American Psychiatric Association
  Amicus brief of the Criminal Justice Legal Foundation
  Amicus brief of the American Association on Mental Retardation
 Virginia Supreme Court Opinion in Atkins v. Commonwealth including dissents of Hassell and Koontz
  Blog entry from the Daily Kos

United States Supreme Court decisions that overrule a prior Supreme Court decision
United States Supreme Court cases
United States Supreme Court cases of the Rehnquist Court
Cruel and Unusual Punishment Clause and death penalty case law
Capital punishment in Virginia
Legal history of Virginia
2002 in United States case law
Intellectual disability